Halima Buba is a Nigerian business woman and banker from Adamawa state. She currently serves as the Managing Director and CEO of Sun Trust Bank plc.

Life 
Buba graduated with a bachelors degree in Business management and MBA from the University of Maiduguri. She is an alumnus of the Lagos Business School and honorary member of the Chartered Institute of Bankers and a Fellow of the Institute of Management Consultants.

She was appointed as the MD/CEO of Sun Trust Bank in January 2021 after serving as the deputy general manager in Ecobank Nigeria.

References 

Living people
Nigerian women business executives
Year of birth missing (living people)
University of Maiduguri alumni
People from Adamawa State